Steve McCrory (April 13, 1964 – August 1, 2000) was an American boxer, who won the Flyweight Gold medal at the 1984 Summer Olympics. A year earlier he won a bronze medal at the 1983 Pan American Games.

Personal life
McCrory is the brother of former WBC Welterweight champion Milton McCrory.

Amateur career
1982 United States Amateur flyweight champion (spring)
1983 United States Amateur flyweight champion
 Won the Flyweight Gold Medal for the United States at the 1984 Olympics in Los Angeles.

Olympic Results
Defeated Tad Joseph (Grenada) walkover
Defeated Fausto Garcia (Mexico) RSC 1
Defeated Peter Ayesu (Malawi) 5-0
Defeated Eyup Can (Turkey) 5-0
Defeated Redzep Redzepovski (Yugoslavia) 4-1

Professional career
Nicknamed Bluesman, McCrory began his professional career in 1984 and challenged IBF Bantamweight Title holder Jeff Fenech in 1986.  Fenech dominated and won via 14th-round TKO.  This was to be McCrory's last shot at a major title, and he later moved up to Super Featherweight and was beaten by Jesse James Leija.

Death
McCrory died on August 1, 2000 after a prolonged illness.

References

External links
 

1964 births
2000 deaths
African-American boxers
Boxers from Detroit
Flyweight boxers
Boxers at the 1983 Pan American Games
Boxers at the 1984 Summer Olympics
Olympic boxers of the United States
Winners of the United States Championship for amateur boxers
American male boxers
Olympic gold medalists for the United States in boxing
Medalists at the 1984 Summer Olympics
Pan American Games bronze medalists for the United States
Pan American Games medalists in boxing
Medalists at the 1983 Pan American Games
20th-century African-American sportspeople